(Chinese: Fàn Wénquè) was a Japanese-speaking Taiwanese actress who lived and worked in Japan.

Career
She was mostly known as a character actress. She became famous playing an unfortunate half-Japanese, half African-American volleyball player called Jun Sanders in a 1969 volleyball drama called Sain wa V.  She went on to appear in films such as Alleycat Rock: Female Boss and the Playgirl TV detective series. In her later career, she provided the Japanese voice-over for the lead character in Dr. Quinn, Medicine Woman and appeared as the mother of Itsuki Fujii in Love Letter. She was also active in stage acting in the later part of her career, and was due to appear in a new production at the time of her unexpected death.

She had a brief career as a singer, releasing three singles in the 1970s.

Personal life
She was a Taiwanese citizen, but did not speak Chinese.

She married Akira Terao in 1973 and retired, but they divorced in 1974.

She died of complications of cancer. Her grave is at Miura Reien on the Miura Peninsula. On the grave, her name is spelt in roman letters "Fuan Bunjaku". Ironically her most famous acting role, Jun Sanders, was of a girl who died prematurely due to cancer.

Filmography
Alleycat Rock: Female Boss (1970)
Stray Cat Rock: Machine Animal (1970)
Stray Cat Rock: Wild Jumbo (1970)
Lill, My Darling Witch - original title  (1971)
 (1972)
Proof of the Man (1977) - Naomi, the car accident victim
White Love (1979) - Taeko Nogawa 
New Female Convict: Scorpion - original title  (1976) Nami Matsushima (Sasori)'s sister
 (1982) Keiko Tayama
Love Letter (1995)
Innocent World - original title  (1998)

Television

Regular
Sain wa V as Jun Sanders 
Playgirl as Yumin Darowa
Attention Please (1970-1971 version), as Sanae Tamura
G-Men '82

Guest
G-Men '75
Tantei Monogatari (1979) - episode 14  as Akiko Osugi

Discography
 Anata ga Nikumenai ("I can't hate you") / Saigo no Ichijikan ("The last hour") released by Warner Brothers Japan on 25 February 1971.
 Sasurai no Barokku / Nichiyō no Asa Ochiba released by Nihon Crown on 20 August 1972
 Kagerō / Kaerimichi released by Nihon Columbia on 1 March 1977

Writings
 - Her memoirs

References

External links

Japanese actresses
Taiwanese expatriates in Japan
1948 births
2002 deaths